The 1999–2000 Scottish League Cup was the 54th staging of the Scotland's second most prestigious football knockout competition, also known for sponsorship reasons as the CIS Insurance Cup.

The competition was won by Celtic, who defeated Aberdeen 2–0 in the Final.

First round

Second round

Third round

Quarter-finals

Semi-finals

Final

External links
Scottish League Cup 1999/2000

Scottish League Cup seasons
League Cup